The Government of Croatia, formally the Government of the Republic of Croatia, commonly abbreviated to Croatian Government , is the main executive branch of government in Croatia. It is led by the president of the Government, informally abbreviated to premier or prime minister. The prime minister is nominated by the president of the Republic from among those candidates who enjoy majority support in the Croatian Parliament; the candidate is then chosen by the Parliament. There are 20 other government members, serving as deputy prime ministers, government ministers or both; they are chosen by the prime minister and confirmed by the Parliament (Sabor). The Government of the Republic of Croatia exercises its executive powers in conformity with the Croatian Constitution and legislation enacted by the Croatian Parliament. The current government is led by Prime Minister Andrej Plenković.

Following the Croatian–Hungarian Settlement of 1868, the Kingdom of Croatia-Slavonia and the Government of the Land or officially the Royal Croatian-Slavonian-Dalmatian Government of the Land ( or Kraljevska hrvatsko-slavonsko-dalmatinska zemaljska vlada)—headed by a crown-appointed ban—were established. This government existed until the Austria-Hungary breakup and the Kingdom of Serbs, Croats and Slovenes' creation in 1918. In 1939, the Banovina of Croatia was established and a head of the Banovina of Croatia (Ban) was appointed by the crown, but no effective government was formed before World War II. In 1943, the ZAVNOH established an executive board to act as a new government. Communist Croatia, while a part of Communist Yugoslavia, had a separate government (from 1953 to 1990 known as the Executive Council, appointed by the Sabor) with limited powers (excluding defence and foreign relations; this was similar to all the previous governmental forms). Following the first multi-party elections and the adoption of the present Constitution of Croatia in 1990, the present governmental form was adopted and Stjepan Mesić became the first person to lead a non-communist government (under Yugoslavia's government), while Josip Manolić was the first prime minister of an independent Croatia. Since Communist rule's end, the Republic of Croatia has had fourteen governments headed by twelve different prime ministers. Nine governments have been formed by the Croatian Democratic Union, three by the Social Democratic Party of Croatia, one was headed by a non-partisan prime minister and one was a national unity government (formed during the Croatian War of Independence's peak).

Terminology
The term "government" in Croatia primarily refers to the executive branch, as used by the government itself, the press and colloquially, as that branch of the government is responsible for day-to-day governance of the nation; this sense is intended when it is said that a political party forms the government.

Structure and powers 

The government, the main executive power of the Croatian state, is headed by the prime minister (PM). The PM currently has four deputies (elected by the Croatian Parliament), who also serve as government ministers; there are 16 other ministers, who are appointed by the prime minister with the approval of the Sabor (by absolute majority vote). The government ministers are each in charge of a particular sector of activity such as Foreign Affairs. The prime minister and all the deputies form an inner cabinet, tasked with coordinating and supervising the work of government ministers on behalf of the PM; the inner cabinet also prepares materials for meetings of the full government cabinet (consisting of the inner cabinet and the remaining 16 ministers). The first deputy prime minister also discharges the duties of the prime minister when the latter is incapacitated or absent. State secretaries are the highest officials below each minister. There are one or more State secretaries in the ministries. Each State secretary is appointed by the government for the term of the minister, and is responsible to the minister. They act as deputy ministers and attend meetings only exceptionally. State secretaries are also heads of the Central State Offices (see below).

The executive branch is responsible for proposing legislation and a budget, executing the laws and guiding the foreign and internal policies of the republic. The government's official residence is at the Banski dvori in Zagreb. Although the cabinet normally meets at the Banski dvori, occasionally its meetings are held elsewhere in the country.

The Government of the Republic of Croatia exercises its executive powers in conformity with the Croatian Constitution and legislation enacted by the Croatian Parliament, the Sabor. Its structure, operational procedures and decision-making processes are defined by the Government of the Republic of Croatia Act (2011 with 2014 and 2016 amendments) and the Government Rules of Procedure (2015 with 2015 amendments). The Constitution mandates that the government proposes legislation and other documents to the parliament, proposes the budget and gives financial reports, implements Acts and other decisions of the parliament, enacts any regulations required to implement the Acts, defines foreign and internal policies, directs and oversees the operation of state administration, promotes the economic development of the country, directs the activities and development of public services and performs other activities conforming to the provisions of the Constitution and applicable legislation. The government also passes regulations and administrative acts and orders appointments and removals of appointed officials and civil servants within the scope of its powers. It makes rulings in cases of conflicts of jurisdiction between governmental institutions, responds to questions asked parliamentary majority and opposition representatives, prepares proposals of new legislation and other regulations, gives opinions on legislation and other regulations and adopts strategies for the economic and social development of the country.

The government manages state property of the Republic of Croatia unless special legislation provides otherwise. It may appoint special committees to manage the property on its behalf; this process is implemented through appointed members of supervisory boards and managing boards of companies partially or wholly owned by the Republic of Croatia. The government also determines these appointees' salaries. It maintains specialized bodies, agencies and offices—including the Legislation Office, the Office for Human Rights and the Rights of National Minorities and Public Relations Service—that are required by the Government Act of 2011, as well as committees to decide administrative matters. Various branches of government may establish joint services. There are further entities established by the government as companies designed to support the aims of the Government, such as the Croatian Bank for Reconstruction and Development that strives to fund the reconstruction and development of the economy of Croatia.

Local (city/municipality) and regional (county)
governments are separate from the central government; the latter maintains a State Administration Office in each county, under the Ministry of Public Administration.

This is a responsible government to the Croatian Parliament, which may recall it as a whole or in part by an absolute majority vote (majority of all MPs) following a request for a confidence vote by one fifth of the parliament members or by the prime minister. The prime minister and other members are jointly responsible for decisions passed by their government and individually responsible for their respective portfolios (areas of responsibility). The President of the Republic appoints the prime minister, who must then secure a vote of confidence from the Croatian Parliament (majority of all MPs); the appointment is therefore counter-signed by the speaker of the parliament to signify this. The prime minister appoints members approved by the Croatian Parliament (again signified via a counter-signature by the speaker of the parliament). The rules of procedure and regulations enacted by the government must be published in Narodne novine—the official gazette of Croatia—to bind.

Offices and agencies

Operations
Government meetings are typically public. It may close any part of its sessions (or entire sessions) to the public. The prime minister may authorise any deputy to represent the PM and otherwise take over any particular task assigned to the PM. The quorum for government sessions is a majority of government members. Most decisions are reached by a simple majority vote; a two-thirds majority vote is required for decisions about changes to the Croatian Constitution, uniting with other states or transferring any part of Croatian sovereignty to supranational organisations, changes to Croatian borders, dissolution of the parliament, or calling a referendum.

The inner or core cabinet (the prime minister and the PM's deputies) monitors and discusses the operation of the government, and may hold preliminary discussions on any matter performed by the government. The core cabinet may act as the government in emergencies when the government is unable to meet. Its decisions must be verified at the next government session to remain in force. The Government Secretary coordinates agencies, offices and other services subordinated to the government.

Current cabinet

History

Short-lived Croatian Royal Council (1767–79), appointed by queen Maria Theresa, was a central authority administering economic, political and military matters in Kingdom of Croatia. Ban's Council of 1848–1850 was the first executive council established in Croatia. It acted as an administrative body governing Croatia (and Slavonia) within the Austrian Empire as a government, later to be replaced by the Ban's Government (1850–1854), Royal Lieutenancy for Croatia and Slavonia (1854–1861), and Royal Lieutenancy Council (1861–1868) in Zagreb (with Royal Croatian-Slavonian-Dalmatian Chancellery in Vienna, 1862–1868).

Following the Austro-Hungarian Compromise of 1867 and the subsequent Croatian–Hungarian Settlement of 1868, the Kingdom of Croatia-Slavonia was established, along with the Government of the Land, officially the Royal Croatian-Slavonian-Dalmatian Government of the Land ( or Kraljevska hrvatsko-slavonsko-dalmatinska zemaljska vlada) headed by a crown-appointed ban. The establishment was carried out during the administration of Ban Levin Rauch. This government form continued until the breakup of Austria-Hungary and creation of the Kingdom of Serbs, Croats and Slovenes in 1918. In total, 15 Bans acted as heads of the government in this period. The Royal Croatian-Slavonian-Dalmatian Government was not a parliamentary government, as its cabinet ministers and its head (Ban) were not appointed or confirmed by the Croatian Parliament (Sabor), but by Hungarian-Croatian government in Budapest.

In the Kingdom of Yugoslavia, the Cvetković–Maček Agreement was made in 1939; it established the Banovina of Croatia and Ivan Šubašić was appointed as ban to head the Croatian government (Ban's Government). Still, an effective government was not formed before the onset of World War II.

In June 1943, the National Anti-Fascist Council of the People's Liberation of Croatia (ZAVNOH) established an 11-member Executive Board to act as the new government of Croatia. The first People's Government of the Federal State of Croatia (led by Vladimir Bakarić) was founded at the extraordinary session of the Presidency of the National Anti-Fascist Council of the People's Liberation of Croatia (ZAVNOH), which was held on April 14, 1945 in Split.

People's Republic of Croatia, from 1963 Socialist Republic of Croatia, a part of Yugoslavia, maintained its own government (of limited powers, excluding defence and foreign relations). The government was appointed by and responsible to the Sabor. During the Communist era, there were 14 governments of Croatia. From 1953 to 1990 the official name of the government was the Executive Council of the Sabor.

Following the parliamentary elections and the adoption of the present Constitution of Croatia in 1990, the present form of government was begun. On 30 May 1990, Stjepan Mesić became the first person to hold the title of Prime Minister of Croatia, and Franjo Gregurić was the first prime minister of an independent Croatia, as he held the office on 8 October 1991 when the declaration of independence came into effect.

List

Since 30 May 1990 (the first multi-party parliamentary election held following the 45-year Communist rule), the Republic of Croatia has had a total of fourteen governments headed by twelve different prime ministers. The prime minister in the first government after the first multi-party election was Stjepan Mesić, who would later go on to become the President of Croatia. That government was formed by the Croatian Democratic Union (HDZ), as were seven other governments of Croatia. Three governments have been formed by the Social Democratic Party of Croatia (SDP), and one was a national unity government (representing a wide coalition of political parties) formed during the Croatian War of Independence's peak, between July 1991 and August 1992, with Franjo Gregurić as the prime minister.

See also

Elections in Croatia

Notes

References

External links
 
 

 
 
Croatia
Croatia
Modern history of Croatia
European governments